Haute-Corse (or) is (as of 2022) an administrative department of France, consisting of the northern part of the island of Corsica. The corresponding departmental territorial collectivity merged with that of Corse-du-Sud on 1 January 2018, forming the single territorial collectivity of Corsica, with territorial elections coinciding with the dissolution of the separate councils. However, even though its administrative powers were ceded to the new territorial collectivity, it continues to remain an administrative department in its own right. In 2019, it had a population of 181,933.

History 

The department was formed on 1 January 1976, when the department of Corsica was divided into Upper Corsica (Haute-Corse) and Southern Corsica (Corse-du-Sud). The department corresponds exactly to the former department of Golo, which existed between 1793 and 1811.

On 6 July 2003, a referendum on increased autonomy was voted down by a very thin majority: 50.98 percent against to 49.02 percent for. This was a major setback for French Minister of the Interior Nicolas Sarkozy, who had hoped to use Corsica as the first step in his decentralization policies.

On 1 January 2018, Haute-Corse's administrative powers were partly ceded to the new territorial collectivity of Corsica.

Geography 
The department is surrounded on three sides by the Mediterranean Sea and on the south by the department of Corse-du-Sud. Rivers include the Abatesco, Golo and Tavignano.

Principal towns

The most populous commune is Bastia, the prefecture. As of 2019, there are 7 communes with more than 5,000 inhabitants:

Demographics 
The people living in the department are called Supranacci.

Politics

The current prefect of Haute-Corse is François Ravier, who took office on 3 June 2019.

Current National Assembly representatives

Tourism

See also
Cantons of the Haute-Corse department
Communes of the Haute-Corse department
Arrondissements of the Haute-Corse department

Notes

References

External links
  Prefecture website

  
  Corsica Isula 

 
1976 establishments in France
Departments of Corsica
Corsica region articles needing translation from French Wikipedia
States and territories established in 1976